Felix Kikwai Kibore (born February 18, 1988, in Kenya) is a Qatari long-distance runner of Kenyan origin. Kibore represented Qatar at the 2008 Summer Olympics in Beijing, where he competed for the men's 10,000 metres, along with his compatriots Essa Ismail Rashed and Ahmad Hassan Abdullah. He finished the race in twenty-second place by nearly two seconds ahead of Spanish long-distance runners Carles Castillejo and Ayad Lamdassen, with a time of 28:11.92.

Kibore had also achieved his best result in long-distance running, when he finished ninth in the finals of the men's 5000 metres at the 2007 IAAF World Championships in Osaka, Japan.

References

External links

NBC 2008 Olympics profile

1988 births
Living people
Qatari male long-distance runners
Kenyan male long-distance runners
Kenyan emigrants to Qatar
Olympic athletes of Qatar
Athletes (track and field) at the 2008 Summer Olympics
Asian Games medalists in athletics (track and field)
Athletes (track and field) at the 2010 Asian Games
Asian Games bronze medalists for Qatar
Medalists at the 2010 Asian Games